Juan Sebastián Sánchez (born June 29, 1997) is an American soccer player who plays as a forward for the University of Tulsa.

Career

Early career
Born in Peru, Sánchez moved to the United States when he was eleven years old. He joined the local club side, Munay Soccer Academy, where he played for three years. He then joined the New York Red Bulls academy side. During the 2014/15 season Sánchez led the Red Bulls U17/U18's with 17 goals in 21 matches. Despite appearing for NYRB II, Sánchez was able to maintain his college eligibility and joined the Tulsa Golden Hurricane in August 2015.

USL
On January 27, 2015, it was announced that Sánchez would be a part of the Red Bulls first-team pre-season camp in Florida. Then, on March 27, it was announced that he would be a part of the New York Red Bulls II side that would play in the United Soccer League, the third-tier of soccer in the United States. Sánchez then made his debut for the Red Bulls II the next day against the Rochester Rhinos. He came on as a 79th-minute substitute as the Red Bulls II drew the game 0–0. On July 25, 2015, Sánchez scored his first goal for Red Bulls II in a 4–3 victory over Richmond Kickers.

International
Despite being born in Peru, Sánchez has been called up to the United States U18 team.

Career statistics

References

External links
Tulsa Golden Hurricane bio
New York Red Bulls U-17/18 (2014–2015) ussda.com

1997 births
Living people
American soccer players
Tulsa Golden Hurricane men's soccer players
New York Red Bulls II players
Association football forwards
USL Championship players
Footballers from Lima
Peruvian footballers
Peruvian emigrants to the United States